Walter David Rodríguez Burgos (born 7 October 1995) is a Paraguayan professional footballer who plays as a central midfielder for Independiente Medellín in the Categoría Primera A.

Club career
He began playing soccer at school Soccer Sportivo Luqueño in Luque, then joined the training divisions of Sportivo Luqueño, since then, has been climbing categories, being captain of all the youth teams. The Olimpia was interested in him, but the player decided to remain in the Sportivo Luqueño was called to train with the first team in late 2013 and was part of the main campus to the opening of 2015. Due to its remarkable game aroused the attention of several European teams, which set their sights on the young paraguayan steering wheel only 19 years old and went to try his luck in Italy Reggina, this transfer was thwarted by a penalty he received the Italian club by problems with the documents. But in 2015 a business group acquired its card and carried it back to the Italian football.

Parma Calcio
In Italia, he first tried to join Virtus Entella, but the team was already complete. In September 2015, the player signed the contract with the Parma Calcio.

Club Nacional
Rodríguez signed with Club Nacional in the Paraguayan Primera División in the start of January 2017.

References

External links
 

1995 births
Living people
Sportspeople from Luque
Paraguayan footballers
Paraguayan expatriate footballers
Association football midfielders
Paraguayan Primera División players
Serie D players
Categoría Primera A players
Sportivo Luqueño players
Parma Calcio 1913 players
Club Nacional footballers
Deportivo Capiatá players
12 de Octubre Football Club players
Independiente Medellín footballers
Paraguayan expatriate sportspeople in Italy
Paraguayan expatriate sportspeople in Colombia
Expatriate footballers in Italy
Expatriate footballers in Colombia